Niren Lahiri or Nirendranath Lahiri (17 July 1908 –  2 December 1972) was a Bengali and Hindi film director. He received 9th Annual BFJA Awards in 1946 and 2nd National Film Awards in 1955.

Career
Lahiri was born in Kolkata, British India in 1907. His father's name was Jitendra Nath Lahiri. Initially he started his career as an actor in Pramathesh Barua’s studio. He worked with Mr. Barua at New Theatres. He acted in Abhinav in 1940 directed by Debaki Bose. Lahiri was the music director of Ashiana, Tarubala and Annapurnar Mandir in 1936. In 1940 he made his directional debut in the film Byabodhan. He became popular after directing Bhabhi Kaal in 1945. He directed about 27 films including Bengali and Hindi cinema. Lahiri died in 1972.

Filmography
 Raat Dastey
 Rajdrohi
 Chhabi
 Indrani (film)
 Tansen
 Boro Maa
 Madhumalati
 Prithibi Amare Chaay
 Bhola Master
 Shankar Narayan Bank
 Devimalini
 Jadubhatta
 Kalyani
 Shobha
 Kajari
 Lakh Taka
 Palli Samaj
 Subhadra
 Garobini
 Singhadwar
 Jayjatra
 Sadharan Meye
 Vijay Yatra
 Arabian Nights
 Bano Phool
 Bhabhi Kaal
 Anban
 Dampati
 Sahadharmini
 Garmil
 Mahakavi Kalidas
 Byabodhan

References

External links
 

1900s births
1972 deaths
Bengali film directors
Hindi-language film directors
People from Kolkata
Male actors in Bengali cinema
People from British India
20th-century Indian male actors
20th-century Indian film directors
National Film Award (India) winners
Film directors from Kolkata